This is a list of notable events in country music that took place in the year 1991.

Events
 March 16 — The country music world is stunned when seven members of Reba McEntire's band and her road manager are killed in a plane crash in California. McEntire – who traveled separately – recorded her album, For My Broken Heart in their memory.
 August 16 — Holly Dunn asks that radio stations withdraw her single "Maybe I Mean Yes" due to listener complaints that its lyrics condone date rape.
 August 30 — Country music pioneer, Dottie West is seriously injured while en route to a Grand Ole Opry performance in Nashville, Tennessee. Her fans and contemporaries are deeply saddened when she dies of her injuries September 4 at a Nashville hospital. President George H. W. Bush sends his condolences to the country music world during the CMA Awards later that year.
 September 28 — Ropin' the Wind by Garth Brooks becomes the first album to debut at No. 1 on Billboard magazines Top Country Albums and Billboard 200 Albums charts. The album, Brooks' third, vaults the 29-year-old singer into superstardom and goes on to sell 16 million copies worldwide. The album became the second best selling album of all genres in 1991, coming in second to Mariah Carey's debut album.
 November 24 — Hot Country Nights begins a one-season run on NBC. The series was created to cash in on the exploding popularity of country music, and showcased several acts on each episode; featured on the premiere were Alabama, Clint Black, K.T. Oslin, Kenny Rogers and Pam Tillis. The series did not catch on in the ratings and is canceled at the end of the season.

No dates
 Naomi Judd announces she had been diagnosed with Hepatitis C, a potentially fatal chronic liver disease, and would be retiring from touring with daughter Wynonna at the end of the year. The resulting "Farewell" tour becomes the year's top-grossing act in country music and ends with a New Year's Eve pay-per-view concert.
 "SoundScan" is introduced, providing more accurate Billboard magazine chart ratings that are based on actual sales.  Immediate evidence proved country music had a much bigger audience than previously thought.
 Eight acts have their first Billboard No. 1 songs, including Mark Chesnutt, Mike Reid, Alan Jackson, Doug Stone, Diamond Rio, Trisha Yearwood, Brooks & Dunn and Lionel Cartwright. Three of those – Diamond Rio, Yearwood and Brooks & Dunn – turn the trick with their first national release; Reid's first solo release also hit the top of the chart, but he had hit the Top 5 as part of a duet with Ronnie Milsap (1988's "Old Folks") three years earlier.

Top hits of the year

Singles released by American artists

Singles released by Canadian artists

Top new album releases

Other top albums

On television

Regular series
 Hee Haw (1969–1993, syndicated)
 Hot Country Nights (1991–1992, NBC)

Specials

Births
September 9 – Hunter Hayes, country-pop singer/multi-instrumentalist of the early 2010s best known for his crossover hit "Wanted"
September 21 - Ingrid Andress, known for her 2019-20 hit "More Hearts Than Mine".
December 27 – Shay Mooney, member of Dan + Shay, a rising duo of the 2010s.
September 27 - Sierra Hull Mandolin virtuoso, IBMA mandolin Player of the year 2016 and 2018. Continuous innovator of mandolin and mandolin family instruments, playing in traditional and non traditional ways

Deaths
February 24 — Webb Pierce, 69, honky tonk stylist and pioneer (pancreatic cancer).
March 16 — Chris Austin, 27, member of Reba McEntire's road band (plane crash).
September 4 — Dottie West, 58, legendary and pioneering female vocalist for over three decades (injuries from a car accident).
October 17 — Tennessee Ernie Ford, 72, "The Old Pea Picker;" pop-country singer and TV host best known for "Sixteen Tons" (liver failure).

Hall of Fame inductees

Bluegrass Music Hall of Fame inductees
Flatt and Scruggs
Lester Flatt
Earl Scruggs
Bill Monroe

Country Music Hall of Fame inductees
Boudleaux & Felice Bryant (Boudleaux Bryant 1920–1987 and Felice (Scaduto) Bryant 1925–2003)

Canadian Country Music Hall of Fame inductees
Rhythm Pals
A. Hugh Joseph

Major awards

Grammy AwardsBest Female Country Vocal Performance — "Down at the Twist and Shout", Mary Chapin CarpenterBest Male Country Vocal Performance — Ropin' the Wind,  Garth BrooksBest Country Performance by a Duo or Group with Vocal — "Love Can Build a Bridge," The JuddsBest Country Collaboration with Vocals — "Restless", Ricky Skaggs, Steve Wariner and Vince GillBest Country Instrumental Performance — The New Nashville Cats, Mark O'ConnorBest Country Song — "Love Can Build a Bridge", John Barlow Jarvis, Naomi Judd and Paul OverstreetBest Bluegrass Album — "Spring Training", Carl Jackson and John Starling

Juno AwardsCountry Male Vocalist of the Year — George FoxCountry Female Vocalist of the Year — Cassandra VasikCountry Group or Duo of the Year — Prairie Oyster

Academy of Country MusicEntertainer of the Year — Garth BrooksSong of the Year — "Somewhere in My Broken Heart", Billy Dean and Richard Leigh (Performer: Billy Dean)Single of the Year — "Don't Rock the Jukebox", Alan JacksonAlbum of the Year — Don't Rock the Jukebox, Alan JacksonTop Male Vocalist — Garth BrooksTop Female Vocalist — Reba McEntireTop Vocal Duo — Brooks & DunnTop Vocal Group — Diamond RioTop New Male Vocalist — Billy DeanTop New Female Vocalist — Trisha YearwoodTop New Vocal Duo or Group — Brooks & DunnVideo of the Year — "Is There Life Out There", Reba McEntire (Director: Jack Cole)

 ARIA Awards 
(presented in Sydney on March 25, 1991)Best Country Album - Hand It Down (James Blundell)

Canadian Country Music AssociationBud Country Fans' Choice Award — Rita MacNeilMale Artist of the Year — George FoxFemale Artist of the Year — Michelle WrightGroup of the Year — Prairie OysterSOCAN Song of the Year — "Lonely You, Lonely Me", Joan BesenSingle of the Year — "New Kind of Love", Michelle WrightAlbum of the Year — Michelle Wright, Michelle WrightTop Selling Album — Home I'll Be, Rita MacNeilVideo of the Year — "Springtime in Alberta", Ian TysonVista Rising Star Award — South MountainDuo of the Year — The Johner Brothers

Country Music AssociationEntertainer of the Year — Garth BrooksSong of the Year — "When I Call a Your Name", Tim DuBois and Vince Gill (Performer: Vince Gill)Single of the Year — "Friends in Low Places", Garth BrooksAlbum of the Year — No Fences, Garth BrooksMale Vocalist of the Year — Vince GillFemale Vocalist of the Year — Tanya TuckerHorizon Award — Travis TrittVocal Duo of the Year — The JuddsVocal Group of the Year — The Kentucky HeadhuntersVocal Event of the Year — "Restless", Vince Gill, Mark O'Connor, Ricky Skaggs and Steve WarinerMusic Video of the Year — "The Thunder Rolls", Garth Brooks (Director: Bud Schaetzle)Musician of the Year' — Mark O'Connor

Further reading
Kingsbury, Paul, "The Grand Ole Opry: History of Country Music. 70 Years of the Songs, the Stars and the Stories," Villard Books, Random House; Opryland USA, 1995
Millard, Bob, "Country Music: 70 Years of America's Favorite Music," HarperCollins, New York, 1993
Whitburn, Joel, "Top Country Songs 1944–2005 – 6th Edition." 2005.

References

Other links
Country Music Association
Inductees of the Country Music Hall of Fame

External links
Country Music Hall of Fame

Country
Country music by year